Matt Mays + El Torpedo is the second album by Matt Mays, released in 2005. It is the first with his band El Torpedo.

Track listing

All songs written by Matt Mays, except as noted.

2005 albums
Matt Mays albums